Matourea is a genus in the family Plantaginaceae. It is found in South America. It is the correct name for former genus Achetaria that contained ten species.

The name Matourea refers to the town of Matoury (French Guiana).

Species

 Matourea azurea (Linden) Colletta & V.C. Souza
 Matourea caparaoensis (Brade) Colletta & V.C. Souza
 Matourea crenata (Ronse & Philcox) Colletta & V.C. Souza
 Matourea erecta (Spreng.) Colletta & V.C. Souza (= Achetaria bicolor Pennell)
 Matourea latifolia (V.C. Souza) Colletta & V.C. Souza
 Matourea ocymoides (Cham. & Schltdl.) Colletta & V.C. Souza
 Matourea platychila (Radlk.) Colletta & V.C. Souza
 Matourea pratensis Aubl.
 Matourea scutellarioides (Benth.) Colletta & V.C. Souza (= Achetaria guianensis Pennell)

References

 
 
 
 

Plantaginaceae genera
Plantaginaceae